Geographers on Film is an archival collection and series of more than 550 filmed interviews with experts of the geographic scholar community.  This is a 40 year long initiative.

Production 
The series was created as an historical and educational resource by geographer and professor emeritus Maynard Weston Dow (1929 - 2011) of Plymouth State University, and his wife, Nancy Freeman Dow. The series was supported in part by the American Association of Geographers, the National Science Foundation, Plymouth State University, and the Marion and Jasper Whiting Foundation, of Boston.  It has been ongoing or 40 years.

Synopsis 
The series "highlights leading voices that transformed the discipline of cartography and geography in the 20th century in America."

A prếcis of the collection's point was penned by Maynard Weston Dow:"August 1970 marked the origin of Geographers on Film (GOF). Participants speak for the record (varying from ten to eighty-nine minutes) that samples of the geographical experience are maintained on video; the ultimate concomitant goal is full transcription. The project resulted from teaching thought and methodology courses; students therein would pore over the writings of cognoscenti to acquire an appreciation for the genesis and development of geography as a field of learning. After considering the advantage of having Aristotle on film it was decided to secure in a permanent medium something of the more fertile minds of modern geography. In the beginning concentration was on elder statespersons, thus coverage spans much of 20th Century geography."

The Library of Congress and the American Association of Geographers hold the films in their collections and have both preserved and digitized them. "Geographers on Film are a collection of recorded interviews conducted with hundreds of geographers from August 1970 until the mid-1980s." The National Gallery of the Spoken Word at Michigan State University has a copy, at least some of which is available on line.

As a complement to Geographers on Film, "sixteen thematic video presentations have evolved" which include compilations from the larger oeuvre.

25 Archival Gems 
Short clips from 25 of the interviews are available as a 35-minute, streaming video via the AAG website and YouTube. Geographers featured in this video include, in order of appearance:  

 Carl O. Sauer
 John B. Leighly
 Jan O. M. Broek
 J. E. Spencer
 Fred B. Kniffen
 Clyde F. Kohn
 Richard Hartshorne
 Geoffrey J. Martin
 Preston E. James
 F. Webster McBryde
 Fred Lukermann
 Marvin W. Mikesell
 Melvin G. Marcus
 Hildegard Binder Johnson
 Arthur H. Robinson
 David G. Basile
 Edward B. Espenshade
 Wilbur Zelinsky
 Gilbert F. White
 Chauncy D. Harris
 Edward L. Ullman
 Homer Aschmann
 Jean Gottmann
 Richard J. Chorley
 Thomas Walter Freeman

References

Notes

Citations

Bibliography

External links 
 Association of American Geographers website 
 "25 Archival Gems of the First 25 Years of Geographers on Film," YouTube.com

American Association of Geographers
American geographers
Biographical films about writers
Film archives in the United States
Interviews
Oral history
Documentaries about science
Documentary series